St Alban's Church is in Bewsey Street near to the centre of the town of Warrington, Cheshire, England.  It is an active Roman Catholic church in the Archdiocese of Liverpool.  The church forms part of the parish of Sacred Heart and Saint Alban.  The church is recorded in the National Heritage List for England as a designated Grade II listed building.

History

The parish was founded in 1772 by the Benedictine monks of Ampleforth Abbey, and was the first Roman Catholic church in the town after the Reformation.  The present building dates from 1823 and was designed by Edward Alcock.  In 1893 the sanctuary, designed by Peter Paul Pugin, was added to the church.  The west façade was refashioned in 1909.

Architecture

The church is built in brick.  Its plan consists of a nave with a shallow apsidal sanctuary, a west porch and a five-sided baptistry at the northwest corner.  The porch is pedimented and has a round-headed archway with two orders.  Above this are three round-arched windows and the roof is gabled.

The altar, reredos and sanctuary area were designed by Peter Paul Pugin.  The stone and alabaster free-standing and canopied altar was made by Boulton's of Cheltenham.  On the north side of the sanctuary is the Lady Altar, also by Pugin. The paintings, which depict saints, were executed by Joseph Pippett of Birmingham.  The reredos depicts the legend of St Alban.  The stained glass in the west windows and in the windows in the north and south walls also depict saints.  The parish registers go back to 1774.

See also

Listed buildings in Warrington (unparished area)

References

Roman Catholic churches in Cheshire
Grade II listed churches in Cheshire
Roman Catholic churches completed in 1823
19th-century Roman Catholic church buildings in the United Kingdom
Roman Catholic churches completed in 1909
Saint Alban